Gorny Balykley is a rural locality (a selo) and the administrative center of Gornobalykleyskoye Rural Settlement, Dubovsky District, Volgograd Oblast, Russia. The population was 2,656 as of 2010. There are 61 streets.

Geography 
Gorny Balykley is located in steppe, on the west bank of the Volgograd Reservoir, 76 km north of Dubovka (the district's administrative centre) by road. Suvodskaya is the nearest rural locality.

References 

Rural localities in Dubovsky District, Volgograd Oblast
Tsaritsynsky Uyezd